Mira Bjedov, married Nikolić, (born 7 September 1955 in Mokro Polje) is a former basketball player who competed for Yugoslavia in the 1980 Summer Olympics.

References

1955 births
Living people
People from Ervenik
Yugoslav women's basketball players
Croatian women's basketball players
Olympic basketball players of Yugoslavia
Basketball players at the 1980 Summer Olympics
Olympic bronze medalists for Yugoslavia
Olympic medalists in basketball
Centers (basketball)
Medalists at the 1980 Summer Olympics